Hyperaeschrella is a genus of moths of the family Notodontidae. The genus was erected by Embrik Strand in 1916.

Selected species
Hyperaeschrella dentata Hampson, 1892
Hyperaeschrella insulicola Kiriakoff, 1967
Hyperaeschrella nigribasis (Hampson, [1893])
Hyperaeschrella producta (Kiriakoff, 1967)

References

Notodontidae
Moth genera